Apocalypsis velox is the only species in the monotypic moth genus Apocalypsis in the family Sphingidae. The genus erected by Walter Rothschild and Karl Jordan in 1903. The species was described by Arthur Gardiner Butler in 1876, and is found from north-eastern India and from south-western China to northern Vietnam.

Description 
The wingspan is about 136 mm. The forewing upperside pattern is similar to that of Euryglottis aper.

Biology 
The larvae have been recorded feeding on Callicarpa arborea in India.

References

Sphingini
Taxa named by Arthur Gardiner Butler
Moths of Asia
Moths described in 1876